"Can You Feel the Beat" is a song recorded by Lisa Lisa and Cult Jam and Full Force from their 1985 album Lisa Lisa & Cult Jam with Full Force. The song hit number 69 on the Billboard Hot 100 and number 40 on the R&B singles chart in December 1985. It achieved its biggest success on the Billboard Dance chart, where it peaked at number six.

The hip-hop duo Nina Sky interpolated the song in the bridge of their 2004 hit single "Move Ya Body".

Charts

References

1985 singles
Lisa Lisa and Cult Jam songs
1985 songs
Columbia Records singles
Song recordings produced by Full Force